Roger Waters: The Wall is a British concert film by Roger Waters. Directed by Waters and Sean Evans, it captures performances of Waters' live tour. It premiered in the Special Presentations section of the 2014 Toronto International Film Festival, with Waters and Evans in attendance. The concert design and execution draws heavily from the original concert of the same name that followed the release of the Pink Floyd album The Wall (1979).

In addition to the 90 minutes of music, the film also contains interspersed documentary and interview footage taken from a road trip in Europe, with Waters driving an old Bentley. Waters is also seen reading from John Berger's introduction to Fear, the English translation of Gabriel Chevallier's novel, .

The audio is presented in 7.1.4-channel Dolby Atmos.

Track listing

 "In the Flesh?"
 "The Thin Ice"
 "Another Brick in the Wall (Part 1)"
 "The Happiest Days of Our Lives"
 "Another Brick in the Wall (Part 2)"
 "The Ballad of Jean Charles de Menezes" 
 "Mother"
 "Goodbye Blue Sky"
 "Empty Spaces"
 "What Shall We Do Now?"
 "Young Lust"
 "One of My Turns"
 "Don't Leave Me Now"
 "Another Brick in the Wall (Part 3)"
 "The Last Few Bricks"
 "Goodbye Cruel World"
 "Hey You"
 "Is There Anybody Out There?"
 "Nobody Home"
 "Vera"
 "Bring the Boys Back Home"
 "Comfortably Numb"
 "The Show Must Go On"
 "In the Flesh"
 "Run Like Hell"
 "Waiting for the Worms"
 "Stop"
 "The Trial"
 "Outside the Wall"

References

External links
 
 

2014 films
2014 documentary films
2010s British films
2010s English-language films
British documentary films
Roger Waters